Biju C. Kannan is an Indian film director who works in Malayalam films.

Filmography 
 2004 - Chayam 
 2007 - Thadha
 2009 - Sakshi
 2012 - Kadha mouna mozhi
 2014 - Iruvazhi Thiriyunnidam

References

Malayalam film directors
Living people
Year of birth missing (living people)